Lisa Zetumer Wellman (born October 25, 1943) is an American politician serving as a member of the Washington State Senate representing the 41st district, having defeated incumbent Steve Litzow in the 2016 election.

References

1943 births
Living people
Democratic Party Washington (state) state senators
21st-century American politicians
Women state legislators in Washington (state)
21st-century American women politicians